Iftar Mulaqat is a Pakistani Ramadan talk show aired on Geo Kahani on every day of Ramadan at 6:00 P.M. The show is hosted by Hina Khawaja Bayat along with a famous Chef Shai who cooks different dishes on each day of Ramadan.The show continues to the third day of Eid and then goes off-air.

Each day different celebrities come to join the show with Hina Khawaja Bayat and share different things about their life and their routine, working and life in the month of Ramadan.

Guests
The following is the list of celebrities of Pakistan who have appeared on the show.
 Sarwat Gilani
 Danish Taimoor
 Faisal Qureshi
 Zeba Bakhtiyar 
 Sadia Imam
 Zahid Ahmed
 Junaid Khan
 Yasra Rizvi
 Shahood Alvi
 Nabeel
 Sarah Khan
 Jinaan Hussain
 Behroze Sabzwari
 Hira Tareen
 Sunita Marshall
 Aijaz Aslam
 Nadia Hussain
 Azfar Ali
 Maria Wasti
 Madiha Imam
 Faakhir
 Sana Javed
 Aiza Khan
 Gohar Mumtaz
 Ayesha Omer
 Fatima Effendi
 Rubina Ashraf
 Hina Dilpazeer
 Javed Shaikh
 Humayun Saeed

References

External links 
 

Pakistani television talk shows
2016 Pakistani television series debuts